Colmore is a surname. Notable people called Colmore include:

Charles B. Colmore (1879–1950), second bishop of the Episcopal Diocese of Puerto Rico
George Cyril Colmore (1885–1937), English aviator and Royal Naval Air Service officer
Gertrude Colmore (1855–1926), writer and suffragist
Jacob Colmore (1912–1996), English anti-fascist and gangster
Rupert Colmore (1914–1972), college football player
Charles Colmore Grant, 7th Baron de Longueuil, the son of Charles James Irwin Grant, 6th Baron de Longueuil
Rupert Colmore Sr. (1883–1958), college football player and physician

See also
In the Colmore district of Birmingham, England:
The Colmore Building, formerly known as Colmore Plaza, a 14-storey office building
Colmore Gate, office and retail building
Colmore Row, a street in Birmingham City Centre from Victoria Square past Snow Hill station
103 Colmore Row, 26-storey commercial office skyscraper
122–124 Colmore Row, Grade I listed building on Colmore Row in Birmingham, England
130 Colmore Row, Grade II listed building in the city centre of Birmingham, England

Other:
Calmore
Cole Mohr
Colemore
Cullimore